Neil Young: Heart of Gold is a 2006 American documentary/concert film by Jonathan Demme, featuring Neil Young. It documents Young's premiere of his songs from his album Prairie Wind at the Ryman Auditorium.

The film was produced in the summer of 2005 in Nashville, Tennessee. It premiered at the 2006 Sundance Film Festival, and was released theatrically on 10 February 2006.

Overview
The film opens with interviews with Young and most of his band, which includes Emmylou Harris, Young's then-wife Pegi Young, steel guitarist Ben Keith, and keyboardist Spooner Oldham.  They and the other band members describe the concert and the making of Prairie Wind.  The recording of the album and the filming of the concert occurred just before and after Young's surgery to correct a cerebral aneurysm, and just a few months after the death of Young's father Scott Young.

The first half of the concert consists entirely of songs from Prairie Wind, and the second half consists of acoustic songs from throughout Young's career. Young describes the inspiration behind several of his songs.

Songs in the film
The performance captured in Neil Young: Heart of Gold was filmed over two nights on August 18 and 19 2005 at the Ryman Auditorium in Nashville, Tennessee. Recorded by Chad Halley and David Hewitt on Remote Recording's Silver Truck. In order to increase the length of the concert film, director Jonathan Demme asked Neil Young to supplement the songs from Prairie Wind with an encore set of older songs. Young agreed and selected songs that he had previously recorded in Nashville. The two sets are set apart by a costume change for the musicians and a different backdrop on the stage.

All songs are written by Young, except where otherwise noted.

Prairie Wind set
 "The Painter"
 "No Wonder" 
 "Falling Off the Face of the Earth"
 "Far From Home" – Young introduces the song by telling a story about his father giving him an Arthur Godfrey ukulele when he was about seven years old and working on a chicken farm.
 "It's a Dream"
 "Prairie Wind"
 "Here for You" - from the 'empty nester genre'
 "This Old Guitar" – duet with Emmylou Harris; Young notes that he is playing a guitar (a Martin D-28) once owned by Hank Williams.
 "When God Made Me" – features Young playing piano, backed by the Fisk University Jubilee Singers and Spooner Oldham on organ.

Encore set
 "I Am a Child"
 "Harvest Moon"
 "Heart of Gold"
 "Old Man"
 "The Needle and the Damage Done"
 "Old King" – features Young on six-string banjo, accompanied by Emmylou Harris on rhythm guitar and harmony vocals.
 "Comes a Time" – dedicated to Nicolette Larson who sang on Young's Comes a Time album; features the backing singers and crew lined up across the front of the stage playing acoustic guitars.
 "Four Strong Winds" – written by Ian Tyson.
 "One of These Days"
 "The Old Laughing Lady" – over the closing credits; Young on solo acoustic guitar, alone on stage in a chair, playing to an empty auditorium.

DVD special features
 "He Was the King" – A bonus song from Prairie Wind, not included in the film.
 "The Needle and the Damage Done" – 1971 performance from The Johnny Cash Show.

Performers
 Grant Boatwright – harmony vocals, acoustic guitar, electric guitar (Old Black)
 Larry Cragg – guitar technician, 12-string guitar, six-string banjo, broom
 Anthony Crawford – acoustic guitar, harmony vocals 
 Chad Cromwell – drums, percussion
 Diana DeWitt – harmony vocals, acoustic guitar, autoharp
 Clinton Gregory – fiddle, backing vocals
 Emmylou Harris – harmony vocals, rhythm guitar
 Karl T. Himmel – drums, percussion
 Ben Keith – pedal steel guitar, lap steel guitar, dobro, vibraphone
 The Memphis Horns:
 Wayne Jackson – trumpet
 Tom McGinley – baritone saxophone
 Jimmy Sharp – trombone
 Spooner Oldham – Hammond B3 organ, piano, vibraphone
 Gary W. Pigg – harmony vocals, acoustic guitar
 Rick Rosas – bass guitar
 Neil Young – vocals, acoustic guitar, six-string banjo, piano
 Pegi Young – harmony vocals, acoustic guitar
 Fisk University Jubilee Singers
 Nashville String Machine

Scenic art 
Michael Zansky created  scenic art in Neil Young: Heart of Gold.

Reception 
The film had a limited release to the general public, but came to popular critical acclaim with an 85% average on Metacritic and a 91% Fresh rating average on Rotten Tomatoes.

References

External links
Official website
Metacritic Review
Musicbox-Online Review
Rotten Tomatoes review
Slant Magazine Film Review by Keith Uhlich
 
 

2006 films
Neil Young
Rockumentaries
Concert films
Paramount Vantage films
Playtone films
Shangri-La Entertainment films
American documentary films
Documentary films about singers
2006 documentary films
Films directed by Jonathan Demme
Films produced by Tom Hanks
2000s English-language films
2000s American films